is a professional Japanese baseball player. He plays pitcher for the Tokyo Yakult Swallows.

External links

 NPB.com

1991 births
Living people
People from Mobara
Baseball people from Chiba Prefecture
Japanese baseball players
Nippon Professional Baseball pitchers
Hokkaido Nippon-Ham Fighters players
Tokyo Yakult Swallows players